Patrick Clibborn Larkin (born June 14, 1960) is an American former professional baseball pitcher. He was signed by the San Francisco Giants as an amateur free agent in 1982, and a little over a year later he was in the major leagues. His MLB career spanned a little over two weeks, during which he pitched five games, all in relief. He was traded to the Detroit Tigers the following February, and after spending the 1984 season in their farm system, his career was over at age 24.

Sources
, or Retrosheet
Pura Pelota

1960 births
Living people
Baseball players from California
Birmingham Barons players
Evansville Triplets players
Great Falls Giants players
Major League Baseball pitchers
People from Arcadia, California
Phoenix Giants players
San Francisco Giants players
Santa Clara Broncos baseball players
Santa Clara University alumni
Shreveport Captains players
Tigres de Aragua players
American expatriate baseball players in Venezuela